Italy have participated in ten UEFA European Championships, and reached the final on four occasions. They became European champions at home in 1968, the first European Championship they qualified for, and finished as runners-up in 2000 and 2012, before winning their second continental championship at Euro 2020.

UEFA European Championship record
 Champions   Runners-up   Third place   Fourth place  

*Draws include knockout matches decided via penalty shoot-out.
**Gold background colour indicates that the tournament was won.
***Red border colour indicates that the tournament was held on home soil.

Finals

By match
Italy's score listed first

Euro 1968

Final tournament

Semi-finals

Final

First match

Replay

Euro 1980

Group stage

Knockout stage

Third place play-off

Euro 1988

Group stage

Knockout stage

Semi-finals

Euro 1996

Group stage

Euro 2000

Group stage

Knockout stage

Quarter-finals

Semi-finals

Final

Euro 2004

Group stage

Euro 2008

Group stage

Knockout phase

Quarter-finals

Euro 2012

Group stage

Knockout phase

Quarter-finals

Semi-finals

Final

Euro 2016

Group stage

Knockout phase

Round of 16

Quarter-finals

Euro 2020

Group stage

Knockout phase

Round of 16

Quarter-finals

Semi-finals

Final

Player records
Players in bold are still active

Most appearances

Top goalscorers

See also
Italy at the FIFA World Cup

References

 
Countries at the UEFA European Championship
Euro